Swingin' Time  was a music variety show, similar to American Bandstand, hosted by WKNR (Keener 13, Detroit) personality Robin Seymour and also, for a time, CKLW radio's Tom Shannon. This show was broadcast on CKLW-TV Channel 9 (now CBET-DT) out of Windsor, Ontario, Canada, from 1965 to 1968, and also seen in a few other markets in syndication. The show featured recording acts, both nationally and locally popular, lip-synching to their latest releases while teenagers showcased the latest dances on the show's dance floor. In its brief run, the show featured well-known acts Motown like The Supremes, Smokey Robinson & the Miracles, Marvin Gaye, The Marvelettes, Martha & The Vandellas and The Four Tops, and non-Motown acts such as Bob Seger.

Rights to surviving footage of the show are now owned by Research Video.

References

External links
Research Video: "Swingin' Time"

1965 Canadian television series debuts
1968 Canadian television series endings
Dance television shows
First-run syndicated television shows in Canada
Pop music television series
Television shows filmed in Windsor, Ontario
1960s Canadian music television series
1960s Canadian variety television series